Thomas William Hardwick (December 9, 1872January 31, 1944) was an American politician from the U.S. state of Georgia who served as governor of Georgia, a United States Senator from Georgia, a member of the United States House of Representatives from Georgia, and a member of the Georgia House of Representatives.

Early life
Hardwick was born on December 9, 1872, in Thomasville, Georgia. He graduated from Mercer University with a Bachelor of Arts degree in 1892 and received a Juris Doctor degree from the University of Georgia School of Law in 1893.  He was an active member of Phi Delta Theta at Mercer, and while at UGA, he was a member of the Phi Kappa Literary Society.

Personal life
Hardwick married Maude Elizabeth Perkins in 1894. He married Sallie Warren West in 1938. He had one daughter and two stepdaughters.

Career

Law career
Hardwick practiced law in Savannah and then entered politics with the support of Thomas E. Watson. Hardwick was the prosecutor of Washington County, Georgia, from 1895 to 1897.

Political career
Hardwick served as a member of the Georgia House of Representatives from 1898 to 1902; and a member of the United States House of Representatives representing Georgia's 10th district from 1903 to 1914. In 1914 he ran for a seat in the United States Senate in a special election for the unexpired term of Augustus O. Bacon who had died in office. Hardwick won, and served in the Senate from 1915 to 1919. Senator Hardwick was defeated in the Democratic primary for reelection in 1918 by William J. Harris.

Anarchist bombings
As a senator, Hardwick co-sponsored the Immigration Act of 1918, which was enacted in October of that year. Aimed at radical anarchists who had immigrated to the U.S., the new law enabled deportation of any non-citizen who belonged to an anarchist organization or who was found in possession of anarchist literature for the purpose of propaganda.

On April 29, 1919, as a direct result of his sponsorship of the Immigration Act, Senator Hardwick was targeted for assassination by adherents of the radical anarchist Luigi Galleani, who mailed a booby trap bomb to his residence in Georgia. The bomb exploded when Ethel Williams, a house servant of the Hardwicks, attempted to open the package, blowing off her hands and severely injuring Hardwick's wife, Maude.

Governor (1921–1923)
Hardwick then served as Governor of Georgia from 1921 to 1923, and due to his opposition to the Ku Klux Klan, lost to Clifford Walker in the subsequent election. He ran unsuccessfully for election to the Senate in 1922 and 1924, and then retired from politics. He spent the rest of his life practicing law, with offices in Washington, D.C., Atlanta, Georgia, and Sandersville, Georgia.

One of Hardwick's most notable actions as governor of Georgia was his appointment of Rebecca Latimer Felton to the United States Senate as a temporary replacement for Tom Watson, who had died. Though Felton only served for one day, she was the first woman to serve in the Senate.

Death
Hardwick died of a heart attack on January 31, 1944, in Sandersville. Hardwick was interred in Old City Cemetery in Sandersville.

See also
 1919 United States anarchist bombings

Notes

References

1872 births
1944 deaths
People from Thomasville, Georgia
Mercer University alumni
University of Georgia School of Law alumni
Democratic Party governors of Georgia (U.S. state)
Democratic Party members of the Georgia House of Representatives
Democratic Party United States senators from Georgia (U.S. state)
Democratic Party members of the United States House of Representatives from Georgia (U.S. state)
Georgia (U.S. state) lawyers